James L. Pharr, (born 1955) is an American retired fire Marshall and professor of Fire Safety and Engineering Technology, who is active in the fields of fire protection and safety. He has been used as an expert in many legal cases as well as on News and television programs such as ABC, NBC, CBS, Fox, Inside Edition, Dateline, and the Discovery Channel. His investigation videos have been used on the MythBusters program as well as The Oprah Winfrey Show. These investigations have dealt with electrostatic induced refueling fires and explosions. He is a part of the IAAI, NAFI, and NFPA.

Biography

Pharr is currently a professor of fire safety and engineering technology at Eastern Kentucky University. He is co-author of the book Fire Dynamics. He graduated with a BS in Fire and Safety Engineering Technology, School of Applied Science, University Of Cincinnati, in 1999. His continuing education includes:
NC Fire Marshal's Institute – Fire prevention and investigation
 NC Fire Prevention School  - Fire prevention
 National Fire Academy – Fire Dynamics / Fire Modeling
 NC Justice Academy - Fire / Arson Investigation
 National Fire Academy - Fire / Arson Investigation
 College of William and Mary - Fire Investigation
 Rutgers University - Fire Investigation
 NC Office of State Fire Marshal - Fire Inspector's certification program
 Emergency Management Institute – Terrorism preparedness
 Emergency Management Institute – Integrated Emergency Management
Pharr is also a retired fire Marshall for Gaston county, NC.

See also
Inside Edition: Gas Pump Fires Article
Professor at EKU
Dateline NBC: Last Days of a Secret Agent Article

References 

1955 births
American firefighters
Living people
Eastern Kentucky University faculty